According to the Encyclopædia Britannica, "In the 18th century, when women were expected to participate in social and political life, those magazines aimed primarily at women were relatively robust and stimulating in content." Here follows a list of some of the major British periodicals marketed to women in the period. Between them they cover a wide range of material, from Augustan periodical essays, to advice, to mathematical puzzles, to fashion. Some were written and edited by women and others by men. In many cases, both editorship and individual authorship is obscure.

Periodicals marketed to women
 The Ladies' Mercury (27 February 1693 — 17 March 1693): weekly; 4 issues
 The Ladies' Diary: or, Woman's Almanack (1704—1841): annually
 The Female Tatler  (8 July 1709—31 March 1710): thrice weekly; 115 issues
 The Female Spectator (1744—1746): monthly; 24 issues; edited/written by Eliza Haywood
 The Lady's Museum (1760—1761): monthly; edited/written by Charlotte Lennox 
 The Lady's Magazine; or Entertaining Companion for the Fair Sex, Appropriated Solely to Their Use and Amusement, (1770—1832): monthly; merged with The Lady's Monthly Museum in 1832 and La Belle Assemblée in 1837
 The Lady's Monthly Museum; Or, Polite Repository of Amusement and Instruction (1798—1832): monthly; merged with The Lady's Magazine in 1832 and La Belle Assemblée in 1837

Notable contributions by women to general periodicals 
Analytical Review (1788 to 1798): Mary Wollstonecraft
The Athenian Mercury (1690—1697): Elizabeth Singer Rowe
The Examiner (1710–1714): Delarivier Manley
The Gentleman's Magazine (1731—1922): Mary Barber; Anna Eliza Bray; Susanna Highmore; Laetitia Pilkington
The Monthly Mirror (1795 to 1811): Eliza Kirkham Mathews
Monthly Review (1749–1845): Anna Letitia Barbauld; Elizabeth Moody

Images

Notes

See also
The August essay/journalism
History of women's magazines
List of 18th-century British periodicals
List of defunct women's magazines

Further reading
 Adburgham, Alison. Women in print: writing women and women's magazines from the Restoration to the accession of Victoria. London: Allen and Unwin, 1972.  
Batchelor, Jennie, and Manushag N. Powell, eds. Women's periodicals and print culture in Britain, 1690-1820s: the long eighteenth century. Edinburgh University Press, 2018. 
Berry, Helen. Gender, Society and Print Culture in Late-Stuart England: The Cultural World of the Athenian Mercury. Taylor & Francis, 2017. ,  
Clery, E. The Feminization Debate in Eighteenth-Century England: Literature, Commerce and Luxury. Palgrave Macmillan, 2004. , 
Conboy, Martin. Journalism: A Critical History. SAGE Publications2004. , 
 Maurer, Shawn L. Proposing men: dialectics of gender and class in the eighteenth-century English periodical. Stanford University Press, 1998. 

Lists of publications
18th century in Great Britain
Defunct literary magazines published in the United Kingdom
18th century-related lists
18th-century British literature
British literature-related lists
Lists of magazines published in the United Kingdom
Women's magazines
Lists of women writers
Women essayists
History of women in the United Kingdom